As of September 2022 Qeshm Air serves the following destinations:

References

Lists of airline destinations